The Gezira Sporting Club (transliteration:nādī al-ǧazyrah al-reyādī) is the largest multi-sport facility in Egypt. It was founded in 1882 and was originally called Khedivial Sporting Club. It is located on the island of Zamalek in Cairo.

History
The  grounds of the Gezira Sporting Club were initially carved out of the Khedivial Botanical Gardens, and as a result acacias and gardens decorate the area. After the land had been formally leased to the British military command in 1882, club rules were licensed and the land was divided into several recreational playing grounds. At first, the club was for the exclusive use of the British Army. Membership was restricted to applicants elected by the committee, on the recommendation of two members, although British army officers were automatically enrolled. There were about 750 members.

In 1906, the club members asked the Egyptian government for ownership, but their request was refused. Instead, they were granted a 60-year lease.

The exclusive character of the club continued until after World War II. In January 1952, the club was nationalized and became a public club. By this point, most members of the Gezira Sporting Club were Egyptians, but the club's members were from society's elite. As a result of nationalization, the ethos and structure of the club were to be altered during the Nasser regime. Half of its eighteen-hole golf course were given over to a youth club built by the Egyptian government on the club premises (making it a nine-hole course).  Much of what was deemed as a traditionally aristocratic asset was nationalized. 

During Anwar Al Sadat's presidency, a new elevated highway (the 6th October Bridge) was built over the remaining nine-hole golf course and six-furlong racecourse causing the size of the club to further erode.

Despite suffering vandalism, the Gezira Sporting Club still offers most of the sports and games practiced by its founders: golf, tennis, squash, croquet, horse riding and cricket.

As of 2012, membership was estimated to consist of 43,000 families.

Basketball

Golf
 About the course
 18 holes (played on 9 fairways), Par 70, rating 68, three tees.
 Who can play
 Annual members

The 125-year-old par 70 golf course was the first in Egypt.

Tennis
Since 1907, Gezira Sporting Club has been the official home of Egypt's lawn tennis with open tournaments and championships regularly held on its clay courts. From 1925, international celebrities took part in these widely attended events as it staged the International Championships of Egypt.

Despite the launch of the Egyptian Lawn Tennis Association Championship in 1934, Gezira Sporting Club continued to offer its two cups:

 The Doherty: awarded for the singles.
 The Slazenger: awarded for the doubles.

Swimming
The Gezira swimming team was founded in the early 20th century.

Current sports
There are currently around forty sports played in Gezira Sporting Club. Some are:

Other branch
Like other large clubs in Egypt, the Gezira Sporting Club has built another branch. The location is in the 6th of October City. The club in 6 October has been operational since February 2020 with more developments to follow/

References

Clubs and societies in Egypt
Gezira Island
Sports clubs established in 1882
Organisations based in Cairo
Sports clubs in Cairo
Sports venues in Cairo
Water polo clubs in Egypt
1882 establishments in Egypt